Guangzhou True Light Middle School, or True Light High School, is a school located at Shanding, Baihedong Street, Liwan District (formerly known as in Fangcun District), Guangzhou, founded in 1872 by Harriet Newell Noyes, who was an American Presbyterian and missionary for over 140 years. It is the mother school of True Light Middle School of Hong Kong and Kowloon True Light Middle School.

It is near the YMCA Fangcun Branch and beside Guangzhou Puiying Middle School, which is founded in 1879 by Henry Varnum Noyes, who was the elder brother of Harriet Newell Noyes and another missionary and American Presbyterian.

History

On June 16, 1872, the True Light Academy was first founded in Shakee, and in 1913 it was moved to the current location. the Chinese Communists have taken over the school from 1949, reformed as a public school and the Primary school part was used to be named as Primary School of Renji Rd. (1951),  No. 19 Public Primary school of Central District (1955), First Primary School of Taiping Street  (1956), Primary School of Renji Rd. Central District  (1958), Primary School of Renji Rd. Yuexiu District (1960), Ruijin Primary School of Yuexiu District (1967) and Primary School of Renji Rd. Yuexiu District (1971). Until 1996, it was finally renamed back as Guangzhou True Light Primary School.

The Middle School part combined with New Fashion Private Middle School in 1953 named as Guangzhou Long Beach Middle School. In fall of the same year, renamed as No. 9 Middle School of Guangzhou by using the New Fashion Middle School side, and the Renji Rd. side was renamed as No. 3 Middle School of Guangzhou. The New Fashion Private. formerly known as Yinghai Private Middle School in 1947 founded by a group of Teochew people. In April 1987, the High School part renamed as No. 2 Travelling Secondary School of Guangzhou, until 2000, both reused as the True Light Long Beach Middle School of Guangzhou.

In 1954, the Renji Rd. Side was renamed as Guangzhou No. 22 Middle School and during the 1976 was moved to Hongde Rd., Haizhu District once and being back by September 1981, in the duration, the location was used for Guangzhou Foreign Language School.

In 1984, it was named back the Guangzhou True Light Middle School. In 2002 and 2007, The Guangzhou True Light Middle School has rebuild the connection with the True Light Middle School in Hong Kong.

The schools under the name of True Light have been called the Seven Siblings of True Light.

Notable alumni
Zhang Guangning, ex-mayor of Guangzhou.
Anna Chennault, a female prominent Asian-American politician of the Republican Party.
Su Hua, famous female artist.
Zheng Ruyong, female scholar.
Lin Boxi, Yin Haorong, Situ Shu, Athletes of Diving.
Lu Jufang, Athlete of table tennis.

See also
Hong Kong True Light College
Kowloon True Light Middle School
True Light Girls' College
Hong Kong True Light College
Harriet Newell Noyes

External links
the official Website

Middle Schools in Guangzhou